Soisson may refer to:

Gérard Soisson (1935–1983), Luxemburgish banker at the center of the Clearstream Affair
Guillaume Soisson (1866–1938), Luxembourgian engineer, politician for the Party of the Right
Jacques Soisson (1928–2012), French artist, child and adolescent psychotherapist
Jean-Pierre Soisson (born 1934), French politician of the Union for a Popular Movement
Joel Soisson, American screenwriter, producer and director
Renaud III, Count of Soisson (died 1141), son of John I Count of Soissons and Aveline de Pierrefonds

See also
Soisson-Rapacz-Clason Field, a multipurpose stadium in Kalamazoo, Michigan, US
Soissons